Martin Dostál (born 23 September 1989) is a Czech football player who currently plays for Bohemians 1905.

Club career
He made his Gambrinus liga debut for Slavia against Brno on 25 February 2011.

References

1989 births
Footballers from Prague
Living people
Czech footballers
Association football defenders
SK Slavia Prague players
FC Baník Ostrava players
Bohemians 1905 players
Czech First League players
Czech Republic youth international footballers